East Syriac or Eastern Syriac may refer to:

 East Syriac Rite, liturgical rite of several Christian denominations
 East Syriac dialects, eastern dialects of the Syriac language
 East Syriac alphabet, eastern form of the Syriac alphabet

See also
 West Syriac (disambiguation)
 Syriac (disambiguation)
 Syriac Rite (disambiguation)
 East Syriac Church (disambiguation)
 Syriac Christianity
 Syriac language